The 2012 UTSA Roadrunners football team represented the University of Texas at San Antonio in the 2012 NCAA Division I FBS football season. This was the second season for football at UTSA and their first as members of the Western Athletic Conference. Larry Coker returned as the team's coach for a second season. The team played its home games at the Alamodome. This was the second of a two-year FCS to FBS transition period for UTSA, so they were not bowl-eligible. It was UTSA's only season in the WAC, as they joined Conference USA on July 1, 2013. They finished the season 8–4, 3–3 in WAC play to finish in fourth place.

Before the season

Previous season
In 2011, the Roadrunners represented UTSA in its first year of play in a 4–6 season. UTSA started the season with a 2–2 record in the first month of competition with both wins combining for a 75-point advantage and a 3-point loss, with its only decisive loss against ranked FCS Southern Utah. After beating Bacone 54-7, the Runners fell into a three-game slump including eventual undefeated championship contender Sam Houston State and double-overtime loss to fellow FCS move-up South Alabama. UTSA ended its first year with two more wins and yet another 3-point loss.

UTSA ended their first year with a losing record, but outplayed their opponents on the statbook due to lopsided wins and multiple close losses.

Recruiting
23 recruits signed letters of intent to UTSA for the 2012 season. Another three players decided to walk-on, bringing the recruiting class to a total of 26. Robert Singletary decided to transfer from Baylor to UTSA on June 8. He will sit out the 2012 season as required by NCAA transfer rules, but he brings the class total to 27.

Football Fiesta Spring Game
The second UTSA Spring Game, called the Football Fiesta Spring Game, was held at the Alamodome on April 15, 2012 at 2:00 PM. It  featured the roster divided up into the white team, which would play offense, and the blue team, composed entirely of defense. Due to the composition of the teams, a different scoring system would be used. The white team received 6-points for a touchdown, 3 points for a field goal, 1 point for an extra point, and 1 point for a first down. The blue team received 6 points for a touchdown, 5 points for a takeaway or a safety, 3 points for a stop (meaning you prevent the other team from scoring), and one point for an extra point. The two squads matched up over 4 12-minute quarters with a 10-minute Halftime.
Sources:

4,736 fans turned out to see what the UTSA team would have in the 2012 season. They weren't to be disappointed. Six UTSA quarterbacks combined to go 31 of 53 passing for 363 yards and 1 touchdown. After a shaky start the defense also was impressive. They would force 3 interceptions in the back-and-forth showdown. With 1 touchdown rushing, 1 touchdown passing and 2 additional field goals, the final would have been 20-0 in favor of the white team in a regular scoring setting. With the unique scoring system UTSA used, the final would be 44-42 thanks to two first downs before the interception on the White team's final offensive series.

Roster

Schedule

Schedule Source:

Depth chart

Game summaries

South Alabama

Sources:
 
In the opening game of the season, UTSA played the South Alabama Jaguars. The teams previously met in 2011, when South Alabama won 30–27 in double overtime.  This was both teams' first ever game as provisional FBS teams, as well as each other's first FBS opponent.

Texas A&M–Commerce

Sources:
 
In UTSA's first ever FBS home game, they hosted the D-II Texas A&M–Commerce Lions.

Georgia State

Sources:
 
After UTSA's first home game of the season, they travelled to Atlanta to face the FCS opponent, the Georgia State Panthers. UTSA won the previous meeting between the teams 17–14 in overtime.

Northwestern Oklahoma State

Sources:
 
After visiting Georgia, UTSA returned home to face the Northwestern Oklahoma State Rangers. Northwestern Oklahoma State was UTSA's sole NAIA opponent after the NCAA denied the Rangers D-II membership.

New Mexico State

Sources:
 
UTSA began its first WAC schedule facing its first-ever full-FBS opponent, the New Mexico State Aggies.

Rice

Sources:
 
Following its trip to Las Cruces, UTSA played its first non-conference FBS team, the Rice Owls. UTSA visiting Rice marked its progression to playing out of conference home-and-homes against FBS teams, where it will eventually play the majority of their non-conference schedule against AQ conference teams in 2013 and 2014.

San Jose State

Sources:
 
After its visit to in-state Houston, UTSA hosted the San Jose State Spartans in its first-ever conference home game.

Utah State

Sources:
  
After hosting the Spartans, UTSA hosted the Utah State Aggies.

Louisiana Tech

Sources:
 
Following the Aggies game, UTSA went on the road to face the Louisiana Tech Bulldogs.

McNeese State

Sources:
 
After visiting Ruston, UTSA hosted its final non-conference team of the season, the FCS McNeese State Cowboys. UTSA has previously played McNeese State, where the Roadrunners lost 21–24.

Idaho

Sources:
 
UTSA traveled to Moscow, Idaho to play the Idaho Vandals in their final road game of the season.

Texas State

Sources:
 
In its final game of the year, UTSA hosted the Texas State Bobcats in the I-35 Orange vs. Maroon Rivalry's first ever football game.

References

UTSA
UTSA Roadrunners football seasons
UTSA Roadrunners football